Bruno Varani (born September 16, 1925) Born in Santa Fe he was an Argentine basketball player who competed in the 1948 Summer Olympics. His team finished 15th.

He died on May 25, 2005 in Pinamar, Provincia de Buenos Aires, Argentina.

References

1925 births
2005 deaths
Argentine men's basketball players
Olympic basketball players of Argentina
Basketball players at the 1948 Summer Olympics
Sportspeople from Santa Fe, Argentina